Syedpur Shaharpara Union Parishad is a union council under Jagannathpur Upazila of Sunamganj District in the division of Sylhet, Bangladesh. It is located 6 kilometres south-east of Jagannathpur Upazila.

Administration
Syedpur Shaharpara Union Parishad is one of the largest union Parishad in the Sylhet Division. This union Parishad has 9 wards and 41 villages. See below the list of villages.

 Islampur
 Sunatonpur
 Teghoria
 Novagaon
 Shaharpara
 Tilok also spelt Tilak
 Pirergaon 
 Budhrail
 Syedpur
 Boalgaon
 Ahmadabad
 Audot
 Muradabad
 Ulur chon
 Condi Hedayetpur
 Chituliya
 Chak Tilok also spelt Chawk Tilak aka Lalar Chawk
 Jalalabad
 Kamalshahi
 Fatehpur
 Karimpur
 Kurikiyar
 Mirpur
 Muftir Chak also spelt Muftir Chawk
 Mani Hara
 Nurainpur
 Rasoolpur also spelt Rasulpur
 Kurihal
 Tola Khal
 Harikuna 
 Agunkona
 Ishankona
 Mallikpara
 Lambahati

Representatives

Political System
Syedpur-Shaharpara Union Parishad has nine council members from all nine wards. They are elected representative of their wards to the Union Council. Election is held every 5 years and members are elected by universal adult franchise. Current Chairman of  Syedpur-Shaharpara Union Parishad is Taiyab Miah Kamali, who is popularly known as Taiyab Chairman.

Education
Syedpur Shaharpara Union Parishad has
 23 Primary school
 20 Govt. Primary school
 3 High school
 1 College
 4 Madrasa

Notable people
Shah Kamal Quhafah (1291-1385), Arab religious figure
Syeda Shahar Banu (1914-1983), language activist

See also
 Islampur
 Shaharpara
 Jagannathpur Upazila
 Syedpur Pilot High School
 Shah Jalal High School

References

Unions of Jagannathpur Upazila